Montesquiou (Gascon: Montesquiu) is a commune in the Gers department, Southwestern France. It is the historic seat of the Montesquiou family.

Geography

Population

See also
Communes of the Gers department

References

Communes of Gers